Bohnet is a surname of German origin. Notable people with the surname include:

 Eva Bohnet, the maiden name of Eva Köhler, wife of the ninth President of Germany
 Folker Bohnet (1937–2020), German actor, director and playwright
 Iris Bohnet, Swiss professor at the Kennedy School of Government, Cambridge, Massachusetts
 John Bohnet (born 1961), American baseball pitcher 

German-language surnames